Camillo Zemi (22 January 1898 – 10 August 1959) was an Italian discus thrower and hammer thrower who competed at the 1924 Summer Olympics, and at the 1928 Summer Olympics.

National titles
He won four times the national championships at individual senior level.

Italian Athletics Championships
Discus throw: 1927, 1929 (2)
Hammer throw: 1924, 1925 (2)

References

External links
 

1898 births
1959 deaths
Athletes (track and field) at the 1924 Summer Olympics
Athletes (track and field) at the 1928 Summer Olympics
Italian male discus throwers
Italian male hammer throwers
Olympic athletes of Italy
20th-century Italian people